

Johannes Bruhn (10 July 1898 – 20 November 1954) was a German general in the Wehrmacht during World War II. He was a recipient of the Knight's Cross of the Iron Cross. In 1951 he joined the Bundesgrenzschutz (Federal Border Guards), retiring in 1954.

Awards and decorations

 German Cross in Gold on 17 November 1941 as Oberstleutnant in Artillerie-Regimentsstab z.b.V. 818
 Knight's Cross of the Iron Cross on 20 December 1943 as Oberst and commander of Artilleriekommandeur 149
 Commander's Cross of the Federal Cross of Merit 1954

References

Citations

Bibliography

 
 

1898 births
1954 deaths
People from Neumünster
Major generals of the German Army (Wehrmacht)
German Army personnel of World War I
Recipients of the clasp to the Iron Cross, 2nd class
Recipients of the Gold German Cross
Recipients of the Knight's Cross of the Iron Cross
Commanders Crosses of the Order of Merit of the Federal Republic of Germany
German prisoners of war in World War II held by the United Kingdom
People from the Province of Schleswig-Holstein
Military personnel from Schleswig-Holstein